Mutt is an album by the band Lost Dogs, released on Fools of the World and Lo-Fidelity Records in 2004.

For this record, band members chose three songs from their regular bands to remake them in the style of Lost Dogs. Mike Roe brought The 77s songs "It's So Sad" (from 1983's Ping Pong Over the Abyss) and "The Lust, the Flesh, the Eyes and the Pride of Life" (from 1984's The 77s) and his own solo track "Sunshine Down" (from 2001's Say Your Prayers). Derri Daugherty brought  the Choir songs, "Like a Cloud" (from 1994's Speckled Bird) and "To Cover You" (from 1987's Wide Eyed Wonder), plus the modern hymn "Beautiful Scandalous Night."  Terry Scott Taylor brought the Daniel Amos songs "If You Want To" (from 1991's Kalhoun), "Grace Is the Smell of Rain" (from 1993's MotorCycle) and the first song D. A. recorded, "Ain't Gonna Fight It." The trio then added one new track to the end of the record, "I'm Setting You Free (But I'm Not Letting You Go)."

Instead of simply recreating the original performances, each song was given a facelift with different singers taking over the lead vocals. For example, Roe and Daugherty would tackle the D. A songs, and Taylor and Daugherty would sing the 77s tracks. The song that perhaps received the most noticeable rearrangement was the 77's "It's So Sad," which was turned into a rockabilly tune.

Track listing
 "If You Want To" (Terry Scott Taylor)
 "The Lust, the Flesh, the Eyes and the Pride of Life" (Mike Roe)
 "Like a Cloud" (Steve Hindalong/Derri Daugherty)
 "Grace Is the Smell of Rain" (Taylor/Chamberlain)
 "Sunshine Down" (Roe)
 "To Cover You" (Hindalong/Daugherty)
 "It's So Sad" (Proctor)
 "Ain't Gonna Fight It" (Taylor)
 "Beautiful Scandalous Night" (Hindalong/Daugherty)
 "I'm Setting You Free (But I'm Not Letting You Go)" (Taylor/Hindalong)

The band
 Derri Daugherty – guitars, bass, and vocals
 Mike Roe – guitars and vocals
 Terry Scott Taylor – guitars and vocals

Guests
 Tim Chandler — bass
 Steve Hindalong — percussion, glockenspiel, thumb piano, energy chime
 Matt Slocum — cello

Production
 Recorded and mixed by Derri Daugherty at Neverland Studios, Nashville, Tennessee
 Mastered by Ralph Stover at Dirtboy, Orangevale, California
 Art Direction by the Lost Dogs
 Design & Layout by Brian Heyd
 Released by Jeffrey K. for Lo-Fidelity Records

Lost Dogs albums
2004 albums